Second Dance is a 1983 Swedish drama film directed by Lárus Ýmir Óskarsson. Kim Anderzon won the award for Best Actress at the 19th Guldbagge Awards.

Cast
 Kim Anderzon as Anna
 Lisa Hugoson as Jo
 Tommy Johnson
 Hans Bredefeldt as Isak
 Sigurður Sigurjónsson
 Göte Fyhring
 Olof Lindfors as Harry
 Anders Åberg
 Johan Lindell
 Colbjörn Lindberg as Ingvar
 Tomas Norström as Manne
 János Herskó (as Janos Hersko)
 Thore Segelström as Evert

References

External links
 
 

1983 films
1983 drama films
Swedish drama films
1980s Swedish-language films
1980s Swedish films